Artur Asilbekovich Beterbiev (born 21 January 1985) is a Russian-Canadian professional boxer. He is a unified light heavyweight champion, having held the IBF title since 2017, the WBC title since 2019 and the WBO title since 2022.

As an amateur, Beterbiev won a silver medal at the 2007 World Championships, gold at the 2008 World Cup, 2009 World Championships, as well as gold at the 2006 and 2010 European Championships, all in the light-heavyweight division. He also reached the quarter-finals of the heavyweight bracket at the 2012 Olympics.

Beterbiev is particularly known for his exceptional punching power, having won all of his professional fights by knockout or stoppage.

Amateur career
Beterbiev competed as a light-heavyweight and heavyweight in his amateur career. He won the 2006 European Amateur Boxing Championships beating Kenneth Egan and Ismail Sillakh among others. He beat Egor Mekhontsev but lost to two-time world champion Evgeny Makarenko in 2006. In 2007 he beat future unified light-heavyweight champion Sergey Kovalev in the semi-finals, and eventually beat Evgeny Makarenko in finals to qualify for the World Championships. In the finals of the World Championships he faced the little-known Abbos Atoev but lost in an upset.

At the 2008 Olympics he beat Kennedy Katende 15:3, then at the round of 16 he fell controversially to local boxer Zhang Xiaoping who went on to win the gold medal. At the 2009 World Championships, he beat young Cuban Jose Larduet and Uzbek Elshod Rasulov to claim the light heavyweight title.

At the 2011 World Championships he lost in quarter-finals to eventual winner Oleksandr Usyk by 13–17. At the 2012 Olympics he edged out Michael Hunter but lost again by 13–17 to Usyk. Both of these were in the heavyweight division.

Professional career

Early career
Beterbiev moved to Montreal to pursue a professional career. He won his professional debut via a second-round TKO over Christian Cruz at the Bell Centre on 8 July 2013. Beterbiev fought on the undercard of Jean Pascal vs. Lucian Bute, beating Gabriel Lecrosnier by TKO on the fourth round.

North American champion

Beterbiev vs. Cloud
After winning his first five professional bouts, Beterbiev would face off against former IBF light-heavyweight champion Tavoris Cloud for the vacant NABA title on 27 September 2014. After a tentative opening minute from both fighters, Beterbiev opened up and began landing powerful shots that visibly rocked Cloud.

In the final minute, the Russian would drop his opponent three times via combinations. Before this fight, Cloud had never been dropped in his professional career. Beterbiev would close the show in round two, landing multiple hard shots to the head that knocked Cloud out, giving Beterbiev his first title.

Beterbiev vs. Page, Campillo
In December 2014, Beterbiev stopped light heavyweight prospect Jeff Page Jr. in two rounds, winning the vacant IBF North American and NABO light-heavyweight titles. However, Beterbiev was dropped for the first time in a professional fight in the first round of the fight by a straight right to the head. "I felt a bit sleepy before the fight. I think I just lost my concentration for a fraction of a second," Beterbiev said of the knockdown.

Afterwards, Beterbiev would face off against another former IBF world champion, Gabriel Campillo, with his North American title at stake. Both men began cautiously until Beterbiev dropped Campillo late in the first round. The Russian slowly wore down his foe with multiple straight rights to the body. Finally in the fourth, Beterbiev would land a straight/uppercut hybrid that would hit Campillo square on the chin, and followed it up with a perfunctory left hook before walking to his corner while his opponent slid to the canvas, barely conscious. The PSI detector in his gloves stated that the first punch landed with 973 pounds per square inch.

Subsequent defenses
Beterbiev improved his record to 9–0 against Alexander Johnson on 12 June 2015, at the UIC Pavilion in Chicago. Beterbiev knocked Johnson down twice in the fifth and a third time in the seventh before finishing him at 1:38 of the round, clobbering him with a left hook and finishing him off with an overhand right that put Johnson through the ropes down and out.

With the win, Beterbiev added the vacant WBO International light-heavyweight title to his other four minor titles.

In June 2016, Beterbiev defeated Ezequiel Maderna by round 4 TKO, dropping him four times along the way. Beterbiev's eleventh professional win came against Isidro Prieto, whom he knocked out after a flurry of punches at the end of the first round. Beterbiev had several title eliminators and world title shots fall through, including bouts against Sullivan Barrera, Igor Mikhalkin, and Sergey Kovalev. He also faced long periods of inactivity in a promotional dispute against Yvon Michel.

IBF light heavyweight champion

Beterbiev vs. Kölling
In July 2017, Beterbiev had yet another world title eliminator fall through. He was scheduled to face Enrico Kölling, with the winner becoming the IBF's mandatory challenger to unified world champion Andre Ward, but the fight was never finalized amidst Beterbiev's contract dispute. A purse bid was later won by Top Rank, with the American promotion planning to broadcast the fight on ESPN, as part of a show including Jessie Magdaleno. The show was later announced to be taking place on 11 November at the Save Mart Arena in Fresno. Magdaleno would later drop out with an injury.

Andre Ward officially announced his retirement on September, therefore the IBF title became vacant. The IBF later announced that the fight between Beterbiev and Kölling would be for the now-vacant world title. Beterbiev dominated Kölling in a dull fight, walking him down while Kölling refused to engage. Beterbiev finally scored a knockdown in round 12, as Kölling went down on one knee and received a count. When the fight resumed, Beterbiev dropped Kölling again and the referee waved the fight off. Beterbiev landed 322 of 1,111 punches (29 percent) while Kölling landed 64 of 252 blows (25 percent).

Beterbiev vs. Johnson
In October 2018, Beterbiev fought British champion Callum Johnson in a mandatory defence of his IBF world title in Chicago. Johnson, ranked 7th in the world with the IBF at the time, was coming off a round 1 TKO of domestic rival Frank Buglioni; his first fight in nearly one-and-a-half years. Beterbiev accepted the fight on a co-promotional deal with Matchroom Boxing USA, which was aired live on DAZN in the US and on Sky Sports in the UK.

Beterbiev won an action-packed fight by round 4 KO, which saw both men hurt and knocked down; Johnson in round 1 by a Beterbiev right hand followed by Beterbiev in round 2 from a Johnson left hook. Both men fought aggressively but it was Beterbiev who knocked down Johnson a final time in round 4 with another right hand to the head; the British fighter failed to beat the count and Beterbiev retained his world title.

Unified light heavyweight champion

Beterbiev vs. Gvozdyk
After Beterbiev defeated Radivoje Kalajdzic (24-1) by KO in May 2019, Top Rank set to work on a unification fight between Beterbiev and WBC and lineal light heavyweight champion Oleksandr Gvozdyk (17-0) for some time in Autumn 2019 on ESPN. The winner of Beterbiev vs. Gvozdyk would hold two of the four world titles at 175, and set up further unification matches. In July it was announced that the fight would be on 18 October, at the Liacouras Center in Philadelphia. Beterbiev won the fight by 10th round TKO.

Beterbiev vs. Deines
Beterbiev was originally scheduled to fight Meng Fanlong on March 28, 2020, but the fight was scrapped due to the coronavirus pandemic. Because Meng could not fight in Russia in a rescheduled fight and return to China or the United States due to visa issues, Beterbiev chose to make an optional defense against IBF #5 ranked, Adam Deines. On 20 March 2021, Beterbiev stopped Deines in the tenth round with a vicious left hook, handing him his first KO defeat in his professional career.

Beterbiev vs. Browne
On 20 August 2021, Beterbiev was ordered by the WBC to make a mandatory title defense against Marcus Browne. The two camps failed to come to terms during the allowed negotiation period, which prompted the WBC to call for a purse bid, which was won by Beterbiev's Top Rank, who offered $1 005 000 for the rights to promote the fight, while their bidding rivals TGB Promotions offered $1 000 001. Beterbiev's second unified title defense was booked for 17 December 2021, and took place at the Bell Centre in Montreal, Quebec, Canada. Beterbiev began to take over the bout from the fourth round onward, during which he suffered a bad cut from an accidental clash of heads, and won the fight by a ninth-round technical knockout.

Beterbiev vs. Smith Jr.
On 13 February 2022, Top Rank boss Bob Arum revealed that Beterbiev was in ongoing negotiations with WBO light-heavyweight champion Joe Smith Jr. The planned three-belt light-heavyweight unification bout would take place in summer, as Beterbiev would be unable to face Smith Jr. earlier due to his participation in Ramadan. In April 2022, following the WBC and IBF decisions to bar fights involving boxers from Russia or Belarus, it was reported that Beterbiev would instead fight as a Canadian in his expected unification bout with Smith Jr. in June. WBC president Mauricio Sulaiman further stressed that Beterbiev had been living in Canada for 15 years, held a Canadian passport, Canadian residency, and a Canadian boxing license. The bout was officially announced for 18 June 2022, and took place at the Hulu Theater in New York City.

In a dominant performance, Beterbiev knocked down Smith Jr. three times in the opening two rounds en route to a second-round technical knockout, unifying three major world light-heavyweight titles. After the fight, Beterbiev indicated that he would prefer to face undefeated WBA (Super) champion Dmitry Bivol in his next fight, rather than WBO mandatory challenger Anthony Yarde, stating, "Unification fights are more interesting and motivating, I would prefer to be undisputed."

Beterbiev vs. Yarde
Beterbiev was expected to make a mandatory title defense against the number one ranked WBO light heavyweight contender Anthony Yarde on 29 October 2022 at The O2 Arena in London, England. Beterbiev withdrew from the bout on 19 August, due to an undisclosed injury. The bout was re-scheduled for 28 January 2023 at the OVO Arena Wembley. Beterbiev won the fight by an eighth-round stoppage. He knocked Yarde down with a counter right hook to an attempted uppercut, which floored the British fighter at the midway point of the round. Although referee Steve Gray allowed the bout to continue, the corner of Yarde threw in the towel a few seconds later. Beterbiev was down 68–65 and 67–66 on two of the judges' scorecards at the time of the stoppage. He had outlanded Yarde 135 to 111 in total punches and 84 to 75 in power punches by that point.

Beterbiev vs. Smith
On 15 March 2023, Beterbiev was ordered by the WBC to make a mandatory title defense against the former WBA super middleweight champion Callum Smith.

Personal life
Beterbiev was born in Khasavyurt, Dagestan, and is of Chechen descent. He currently resides in his adopted hometown of Montreal, Quebec and became a Canadian citizen. Beterbiev is a Muslim. He is married and has four children.

Legal matters
Artur was formerly promoted by Yvon Michel. After lengthy legal proceedings, which Beterbiev lost in 2018, he was ruled under contract to Michel until 2021. Beterbiev appealed, arguing his contract with Michel had expired in March 2017, then agreed to an out-of-court settlement with Michel. His original 2013 contract had been extended to 2015. A judge ruled that a promised purse, which Beterbiev stated was not completely paid by the following March, over a December 2015 bout with Isidro Prieto, and the fact that Beterbiev agreed to a process of elimination bouts to secure the International Boxing Federation World Light Heavyweight title, despite a four-bout-a-year contractual agreement, did not cause any prejudice to his career. Beterbiev's legal battle kept him relatively inactive, fighting only once in 2017 and 2018, until his contractual dispute was resolved.

"We are proud of the work we have done with Artur during our association, and we wish him the best success in the pursuit of his career," said promoter Yvon Michel after the settlement agreement.

"I am relieved, and happy to now be able to focus one hundred percent on my training and my performances in the ring," said Beterbiev. "I want to thank Yvon and all members of the GYM team for their efforts, and support in developing my career since arriving in Canada in 2013". Beterbiev had entered into new a co-promotional agreement with Eddie Hearn and Matchroom Boxing. However, after one fight under the Eddie Hearn arrangement, Beterbiev left Hearn, and subsequently signed to Top Rank and ESPN.

Professional boxing record

See also
List of world light-heavyweight boxing champions

References

External links
 (archived 2015-06-12)

Amateur results

Artur Beterbiev at Premier Boxing Champions

Artur Beterbiev - Profile, News Archive & Current Rankings at Box.Live

1985 births
Living people
People from Khasavyurt
Sportspeople from Dagestan
Russian male boxers
Russian people of Chechen descent
Chechen people
Chechen sportsmen
Russian Muslims
Olympic boxers of Russia
Boxers at the 2008 Summer Olympics
Boxers at the 2012 Summer Olympics
AIBA World Boxing Championships medalists
Heavyweight boxers
World light-heavyweight boxing champions
International Boxing Federation champions
World Boxing Council champions
World Boxing Organization champions